Sydney Seaforth (born 7 November 1933) is a Guyanese cricketer. He played in three first-class matches for British Guiana from 1951 to 1954.

See also
 List of Guyanese representative cricketers

References

External links
 

1933 births
Living people
Guyanese cricketers
Guyana cricketers